The 1965–66 NHL season was the 49th season of the National Hockey League. Six teams each played 70 games. The Montreal Canadiens won their second consecutive Stanley Cup as they defeated the Detroit Red Wings four games to two in the final series.

League business
A new trophy was introduced for this season. Jack Adams won the first Lester Patrick Trophy for his contribution to hockey in the United States.

February saw the momentous announcement that six conditional franchises had been awarded to Los Angeles, San Francisco, St. Louis, Minneapolis-St. Paul, Philadelphia and Pittsburgh, all to begin play in 1967.  The St. Louis franchise was surprising, as no formal application from the city had been tendered. It was awarded to fulfill the wishes of James D. Norris and Arthur Wirtz, owners of the Chicago Black Hawks, who also owned the St. Louis Arena, which they wanted to sell.

On the debit side, a strong bid from Vancouver was rejected, much to the anger of many Canadians and the protest of their Prime Minister Lester Pearson. A rumour was widely spread — fuelled by a corroborating statement from Leafs' general manager Punch Imlach that the Toronto and Montreal owners had vetoed the bid out of a dislike for sharing the proceeds from television broadcasts of the games. Vancouver would eventually get an NHL franchise in 1970.

The Canadian Amateur Hockey Association (CAHA) called for the end the direct sponsorship of junior ice hockey team and to allow players who graduated from junior hockey to be chosen in the NHL Amateur Draft. CAHA president Lionel Fleury asked the NHL to terminate the existing professional-agreement rather than letting it expire in 1968. NHL president Clarence Campbell declined to terminate the agreement since 95 per cent of NHL players were produced by sponsored junior teams. The NHL felt that a draft of players might be viable but wanted to draft players at a younger age than 20, and wanted to continue making payments directly to amateur teams instead of the CAHA dispersing funds as it saw fit. Discussions remained unresolved until a new agreement with the requested changes was reached in August 1966.

Rule changes
The only significant rule change for this season was a requirement that the teams suit up two goaltenders for each game.

Regular season

Among notable players to debut during this season were Ed Giacomin for the Rangers, Bill Goldsworthy for the Bruins, Ken Hodge for Chicago and Mike Walton for Toronto. In the meantime, however, the career of future Hockey Hall of Famer Ted Lindsay was over, as his request for reinstatement as an active player was vetoed by the Toronto ownership.

The New York Rangers started out well at first but their inexperience
caught up with them and they began losing. Emile Francis decided that he would take over as coach and dismissed Red Sullivan. Francis
found it just as difficult to win and the Rangers were out of contention
afterwards.

Gordie Howe scored his 600th NHL goal in Montreal on November 27 in a 3–2 loss to the Canadiens to the cheers of the local fans. Among lesser milestones in the season were Frank Mahovlich's 250th goal and Johnny Bucyk's and Claude Provost's 200th.

In an unusual incident, the Red Wings' jerseys were stolen from the visitors' dressing room in Montreal the night before a January game, and Detroit was compelled to play in the uniforms of their junior farm team in Hamilton, which were express shipped to Montreal in time for the match.

James D. Norris, owner of the Chicago Black Hawks, died of a heart attack in late February.

Final standings

Playoffs

Playoff bracket

Semifinals

The second game of the semifinal series between Detroit and Chicago on April 10, was nationally televised in the United States.

For the fourth straight year, it was Montreal vs. Toronto and Detroit vs. Chicago in the first round. The Canadiens were victorious over the Leafs in four straight games, while the Wings beat the Hawks in six.

(1) Montreal Canadiens vs. (3) Toronto Maple Leafs
The Montreal Canadiens were the best regular season team, earning 90 points. The Toronto Maple Leafs earned the third seed with 79 points. This was the twelfth playoff series between these two rivals, with Toronto winning six of their eleven previous series. This was a rematch from the 1965 semifinals, where Montreal won in six games. Toronto won sixteen of twenty-eight points in this year's regular season series.

The Canadiens defeated the Maple Leafs in a four-game sweep.

(2) Chicago Black Hawks vs. (4) Detroit Red Wings
The Chicago Black Hawks earned the second seed with 82 points. The Detroit Red Wings earned the fourth seed with 74 points. This was the eighth playoff series between these two rivals, with Detroit winning four of their seven previous series. This was a rematch of the 1965 semifinals, where Chicago won in seven games. Chicago earned twenty-four of twenty-eight points in this year's regular season series.

The Red Wings upset the Black Hawks in six games.

Stanley Cup Finals

The Montreal Canadiens were the defending champions in their twenty-second Stanley Cup Finals, after winning their thirteenth championship the previous year with a seven-game victory over the Chicago Black Hawks. This was the Detroit Red Wings' eighteenth Stanley Cup Finals, having won seven championships previously. Their most recent Finals came in 1964, when they lost to the Toronto Maple Leafs in seven games. This was the eleventh playoff series between these two teams, with Detroit winning seven of their ten previous series. Their most recent series had come in the 1958 semifinals, where Montreal won in a four-game sweep. Montreal won eighteen of twenty-eight points in this year's regular season series. Detroit would not return to the Stanley Cup Finals again until 1995. 

Behind the skilled goaltending of Roger Crozier, who had missed parts of the regular season with illness, the Red Wings won the first two games of the Finals. However, Crozier was injured in the fourth game and the Canadiens won the Cup four games to two. Roger Crozier won the Conn Smythe Trophy as a member of the losing team.

Awards
Bobby Hull set a new record for goals in a season with 54 and a new record for points in a season with 97, earning him the Art Ross Trophy and his second straight Hart Trophy as the league's most valuable player. No left-winger would pace the NHL in points again until Alexander Ovechkin in 2007–08. Jacques Laperriere of Montreal won the Norris Trophy as best defenceman.

All-Star teams

Player statistics

Scoring leaders
Note: GP = Games played, G = Goals, A = Assists, Pts = Points, PIM = Penalties in minutes

Source: NHL.

Leading goaltenders

Note: GP = Games played; Min = Minutes played; GA = Goals against; GAA = Goals against average; W = Wins; L = Losses; T = Ties; SO = Shutouts

Coaches
Boston Bruins: Milt Schmidt
Chicago Black Hawks: Billy Reay
Detroit Red Wings: Sid Abel
Montreal Canadiens: Toe Blake
New York Rangers: Red Sullivan and Emile Francis
Toronto Maple Leafs: Punch Imlach

Debuts
The following is a list of players of note who played their first NHL game in 1965–66 (listed with their first team, asterisk(*) marks debut in playoffs):
J. P. Parise, Boston Bruins
Derek Sanderson, Boston Bruins
Bernie Parent, Boston Bruins
Barry Ashbee, Boston Bruins
Pete Mahovlich, Detroit Red Wings
Danny Grant, Montreal Canadiens
Ed Giacomin, New York Rangers

Last games
The following is a list of players of note that played their last game in the NHL in 1965–66 (listed with their last team):
Bill Gadsby, Detroit Red Wings

See also 
 1965-66 NHL transactions
 List of Stanley Cup champions
 1965 NHL Amateur Draft
 National Hockey League All-Star Game
 1965 in sports
 1966 in sports

Notes

References

External links
 Hockey Database
 NHL.com

 
1965–66 in American ice hockey by league
1965–66 in Canadian ice hockey by league